The Baton Rouge City Club, also known as the Old Post Office, is a historic three-story building at 355 North Blvd in Baton Rouge, Louisiana.  It was built in 1895 as a U.S. post office building.

Its NRHP nomination asserts:The Old Post Office is one of the finest and most pretentious examples of turn-of-the-[20th]-century Renaissance Revival architecture in the state. Few other comparable buildings in Louisiana can boast such a high degree of stylistic sophistication and close adherence to Italian prototypes and such extensive use of terra cotta ornamentation, In its day, its design stood at the forefront of architectural development in the state.

The building was listed on the National Register of Historic Places on June 9, 1980. It was also included in the Downtown Baton Rouge Historic District at the time of its creation on November 10, 2009.

See also
National Register of Historic Places listings in East Baton Rouge Parish, Louisiana

References

External links

National Register of Historic Places in Louisiana
Renaissance Revival architecture in Louisiana
Buildings and structures completed in 1895
East Baton Rouge Parish, Louisiana
Post office buildings in Louisiana
Individually listed contributing properties to historic districts on the National Register in Louisiana